The Strofyli station (Greek: Σταθμός Στροφυλίου Stathmos Strofyliou) was a station of the Attica Rail in Kifisia, Greece. It was the northern terminus of the Lavrion Square-Strofyli railway, at 16.5 km from the southern terminus at Plateia Lavriou, in central Athens. The station was opened after 1900, and it closed in 1938.

The station was also the starting point of a metre gauge freight railway to a quarry at Dionysos. 

Railway stations in Athens
Railway stations in Attica
Railway stations closed in 1938